The Hishikari mine is the largest gold mine in Isa, Kagoshima, Japan. The mine has estimated reserves of 8 million oz of gold and is being developed by Sumitomo Metal Mining.

References

External links 
Core Facilities:Hishikari Mine – Mitsubishi Metal Mining
Hishikari mine at Mindat.org, updated 2018?

Gold mines in Japan
Buildings and structures in Kagoshima Prefecture